Sergio Roitman and Alexandre Sidorenko were the defending champions. Roitman retired in 2009 and Sidorenko chose to not participate this year.
Rui Machado and Daniel Muñoz-de la Nava defeated 1st-seeded James Cerretani and Adil Shamasdin 6–2, 6–3 in the final.

Seeds

Draw

Draw

External Links
 Doubles Draw

Poznań Porsche Open - Doubles
2010 Doubles